Ricky Francis Steirer (born August 27, 1956) is an American former professional baseball player who played three seasons for the California Angels of Major League Baseball (MLB) from  through . He was selected in the fifth round of the 1977 MLB draft by the Angels.

External links

1956 births
Living people
American expatriate baseball players in Canada
Baltimore Bees baseball players
Baseball players from Baltimore
California Angels players
Charlotte O's players
Edmonton Trappers players
El Paso Diablos players
Hagerstown Suns players
Major League Baseball pitchers
Quad Cities Angels players
Salinas Angels players
Salt Lake City Gulls players
Spokane Indians players
UMBC Retrievers baseball players